The 2018 US Open was the 138th edition of tennis' US Open and the fourth and final Grand Slam event of the year. It was held on outdoor hard courts at the USTA Billie Jean King National Tennis Center in New York City.

Rafael Nadal and Sloane Stephens were the defending champions in the men's and women's singles events, however both failed to  defend their titles. Nadal retired during his semifinal match against Juan Martín del Potro. Stephens was defeated in the quarterfinals by Anastasija Sevastova, whom Stephens had beaten at the same stage the previous year.

Novak Djokovic won the men's singles title, defeating del Potro in the final, 6–3, 7–6(7–4), 6–3. It was his third US Open title and 14th Grand Slam, tying Pete Sampras' record to become equal third among all-time Grand Slam champions. In women's singles, Naomi Osaka defeated Serena Williams in the final, 6–2, 6–4, becoming Japan's first-ever able-bodied Grand Slam singles champion.

Tournament

The 2018 US Open was the 138th edition of the tournament and took place at the USTA Billie Jean King National Tennis Center in Flushing Meadows–Corona Park of Queens in New York City, New York, United States. The tournament was held on 17 DecoTurf hard courts.

The tournament was an event run by the International Tennis Federation (ITF) and was part of the 2018 ATP World Tour and the 2018 WTA Tour calendars under the Grand Slam category. The tournament consisted of both men's and women's singles and doubles draws as well as a mixed doubles event. There are also singles and doubles events for both boys and girls (players under 18), which are part of the Grade A category of tournaments. Additionally, there are singles and doubles wheelchair tennis events for men, women and quads.

The tournament was played on hard courts and takes place on a series of 17 courts with DecoTurf surface, including the three existing main showcourts – Arthur Ashe Stadium, the newly renovated Louis Armstrong Stadium, and the new Grandstand.

Broadcast
In the United States, the 2018 US Open will be the fourth year in a row under an 11-year, $825 million contract with ESPN, in which the broadcaster holds exclusive rights to the entire tournament and the US Open Series. This means that the tournament is not available on broadcast television. This also makes ESPN the exclusive U.S. broadcaster for three of the four tennis majors.

Point and prize money distribution

Point distribution
Below is a series of tables for each of the competitions showing the ranking points on offer for each event.

Senior

Wheelchair

Prize money
The total prize-money compensation for the 2018 US Open is $53 million, a more than 5% increase on the same total last year. Of that total, a record $3.8 million goes to both the men's and women's singles champions, which is increased by 2.7% from last year. This makes the US Open the most lucrative and highest paying tennis grand slam in the world, leapfrogging the French Open in total prize money fund. Prize money for the US Open qualifying tournament is also up 10.3%, to $3.2 million. The prize money for the wheelchair draw amounts to a total of US$350,000. The singles winners of the men and women draws receive US$31,200 and the winner of the quad singles receives US$23,400.

Notable stories

Women's singles final

Naomi Osaka defeated Serena Williams in the final, 6–2, 6–4. During the final, Williams received three code violations, the second coming with a point penalty and the third with a game penalty. The issue started during the second set when chair umpire Carlos Ramos cited Serena for a signal that was sent from her coach. Serena said she was unaware of the signal and verbally sparred with Ramos, saying "I don't cheat to win. I'd rather lose." and "You owe me an apology. I have never cheated in my life." After a mistake later in the second set, Serena smashed her racket into the court. This led to her second code violation, which Serena found out about upon attempting to serve and which increased the dispute between Serena and Ramos. During the change at the 3–4 mark, a discussion between Serena and Ramos broke down leading Serena to call Ramos both "a liar" and "a thief." As both players were concluding the changeover and getting set, Ramos issued Serena her third code violation.	
This led to confusion from both players who did not appear to hear the announcement, which Ramos explained to both after summoning them over to his seat. At this point, US Open referee, Brian Earley, and WTA supervisor, Donna Kelso, were summoned to the court due to the dispute. A four-minute delay occurred due to a discussion between Serena, Earley, and Kelso regarding the issues. After the delay, Serena won the next game before Osaka won the set and match.

Day-by-day summaries

Singles players 
Men's singles

Women's singles

Singles seeds
The following are the seeded players and notable players who have withdrawn from the event. Seedings are based on ATP and WTA rankings as of August 20, 2018. Rank and points before are as of August 27, 2018.

Men's singles

†The player did not qualify for the tournament in 2017, but is defending points from one or more 2017 ATP Challenger Tour tournaments.

Women's singles

† Serena Williams was ranked 26 on the day when seeds were announced. Nevertheless, she was deemed a special case and seeded 17th by the organizers because she missed a significant portion of the last 12-month period due to pregnancy and maternity.
‡ The player did not qualify for the tournament in 2017. Accordingly, points for her 16th best result are deducted instead.

Doubles seeds

Men's doubles

1Rankings as of August 20, 2018.

Women's doubles

1Rankings as of August 20, 2018.

Mixed doubles

1Rankings as of August 20, 2018.

Events

Men's singles

  Novak Djokovic def.  Juan Martín del Potro, 6–3, 7–6(7–4), 6–3

Women's singles

  Naomi Osaka def.  Serena Williams, 6–2, 6–4

Men's doubles

  Mike Bryan /  Jack Sock def.  Łukasz Kubot /  Marcelo Melo, 6–3, 6–1

Women's doubles

  Ashleigh Barty /  CoCo Vandeweghe def.  Tímea Babos /  Kristina Mladenovic, 3–6, 7–6(7–2), 7–6(8–6)

Mixed doubles

  Bethanie Mattek-Sands /  Jamie Murray def.  Alicja Rosolska /  Nikola Mektić, 2–6, 6–3, [11–9]

Junior boys' singles

  Thiago Seyboth Wild def.  Lorenzo Musetti, 6–1, 2–6, 6–2

Junior girls' singles

  Wang Xiyu def.  Clara Burel, 7–6(7–4), 6–2

Junior boys' doubles

  Adrian Andreev /  Anton Matusevich def.  Emilio Nava /  Axel Nefve, 6–4, 2–6, [10–8]

Junior girls' doubles

  Coco Gauff /  Caty McNally def.  Hailey Baptiste /  Dalayna Hewitt, 6–3, 6–2

Wheelchair men's singles

   Alfie Hewett def.  Shingo Kunieda, 6–3, 7–5.

Wheelchair women's singles

  Diede de Groot def.  Yui Kamiji, 6–2, 6–3

Wheelchair quad singles

  Dylan Alcott def.  David Wagner, 7–5, 6–2

Wheelchair men's doubles

  Alfie Hewett /  Gordon Reid def.  Stéphane Houdet /  Nicolas Peifer, 5–7, 6–3, [11–9]

Wheelchair women's doubles

  Diede de Groot /  Yui Kamiji def.  Marjolein Buis /  Aniek van Koot, 6–3, 6–4

Wheelchair quad doubles

  Andrew Lapthorne /  David Wagner def.  Dylan Alcott /  Bryan Barten, 3–6, 6–0, [10–4]

Wild card entries
The following players were given wildcards to the main draw based on internal selection and recent performances.

Men's singles
  Jenson Brooksby
  Bradley Klahn
  Jason Kubler
  Michael Mmoh
  Corentin Moutet
  Noah Rubin
  Tim Smyczek
  Stan Wawrinka

Women's singles
  Amanda Anisimova
  Victoria Azarenka
  Lizette Cabrera  
  Svetlana Kuznetsova
  Claire Liu
  Asia Muhammad
  Whitney Osuigwe
  Harmony Tan

Men's doubles
  Christopher Eubanks /  Donald Young
  Christian Harrison /  Ryan Harrison
  Evan King /  Nathan Pasha
  Kevin King /  Reilly Opelka
  Bradley Klahn /  Daniel Nestor
  Patrick Kypson /  Danny Thomas
  Martin Redlicki /  Evan Zhu

Women's doubles
  Jennifer Brady /  Asia Muhammad
  Caroline Dolehide /  Christina McHale
  Nicole Gibbs /  Sabrina Santamaria
  Sofia Kenin /  Sachia Vickery
  Allie Kiick /  Jamie Loeb
  Varvara Lepchenko /  Bernarda Pera
  Caty McNally /  Whitney Osuigwe

Mixed doubles
  Amanda Anisimova /  Michael Mmoh
  Kaitlyn Christian /  James Cerretani
  Danielle Collins /  Tom Fawcett
  Coco Gauff /  Christopher Eubanks
  Jamie Loeb /  Noah Rubin
  Christina McHale /  Christian Harrison
  Whitney Osuigwe /  Frances Tiafoe
  Taylor Townsend /  Donald Young

Qualifier entries 
The qualifying competitions took place at USTA Billie Jean King National Tennis Center on 21–24 August 2018.

Men's singles 

  Ugo Humbert
  Stefano Travaglia
  Federico Gaio
  Casper Ruud
  Marcel Granollers
  Hubert Hurkacz
  Lloyd Harris
  Dennis Novak
  Félix Auger-Aliassime
  Collin Altamirano
  Mitchell Krueger
  Donald Young
  Tommy Robredo
  Facundo Bagnis
  Yannick Maden
  Carlos Berlocq

Lucky losers
  Lorenzo Sonego
  Peter Polansky
  Ruben Bemelmans
  Nicolas Mahut

Women's singles 

  Jil Teichmann
  Marie Bouzková
  Anna Kalinskaya
  Julia Glushko
  Karolína Muchová
  Anhelina Kalinina
  Arantxa Rus
  Francesca Di Lorenzo
  Ons Jabeur
  Nicole Gibbs
  Heather Watson
  Vera Zvonareva
  Kathinka von Deichmann
  Danielle Lao
  Patty Schnyder
  Eugenie Bouchard

Lucky losers
  Madison Brengle
  Mona Barthel

Protected ranking
The following players were accepted directly into the main draw using a protected ranking:

 Men's singles
  James Duckworth (PR 105)
  Andy Murray (PR 2)
  Yoshihito Nishioka (PR 66)

 Women's singles
  Timea Bacsinszky (PR 23)
  Margarita Gasparyan (PR 62)
  Vania King (PR 103)
  Laura Siegemund (PR 32)

Withdrawals
The following players were accepted directly into the main tournament, but withdrew with injuries, suspensions or for personal reasons.

Men's singles
  Tomáš Berdych → replaced by  Viktor Troicki
  Pablo Cuevas → replaced by  Peter Polansky
  Alexandr Dolgopolov → replaced by  Mikhail Youzhny
  Jared Donaldson → replaced by  Lorenzo Sonego
  Guillermo García López → replaced by  Ruben Bemelmans
  Cedrik-Marcel Stebe → replaced by  Guido Andreozzi
  Jo-Wilfried Tsonga → replaced by  James Duckworth
  Jiří Veselý → replaced by  Nicolas Mahut

 
Women's singles
  Catherine Bellis → replaced by  Vania King
  Mihaela Buzărnescu → replaced by  Mona Barthel
  Luksika Kumkhum → replaced by  Madison Brengle
  Mirjana Lučić-Baroni → replaced by  Caroline Dolehide
  Peng Shuai → replaced by  Natalia Vikhlyantseva
  Elena Vesnina → replaced by  Markéta Vondroušová

Notes

References

External links

 
 

 
2018 ATP World Tour
2018 in tennis
2017 US Open (tennis)
2018 WTA Tour
2018
August 2018 sports events in the United States
September 2018 sports events in the United States
2018 in American tennis
2018 in sports in New York City